This is a list of countries where antisemitic sentiment has been experienced.

Africa

Algeria

Upon independence in 1962 only Muslims were permitted Algerian citizenship, and 95% of Algeria's 140,000 Jewish population left. Since 1870 (briefly revoked by Vichy France in 1940), most Jews in Algeria had French citizenship, and they mainly went to France, with some going to Israel.

By 1969, fewer than 1,000 Jews were still living in Algeria. By 1975 the government had seized all but one of the country's synagogues and converted them to mosques or libraries.

Cameroon
In February 2019, deputy justice minister Jean de Dieu Momo advanced an antisemitic canard during prime time on Cameroon Radio Television, and suggested that Jewish people had brought the holocaust upon themselves.

Egypt

Professor Peter Schafer of the Freie University of Berlin has argued that antisemitism was first spread by "the Greek retelling of ancient Egyptian prejudices". In view of the anti-Jewish writings of the Egyptian priest Manetho, Schafer suggests that antisemitism may have emerged "in Egypt alone". According to the 1st century Jewish historian Flavius Josephus, Manetho, a Hellenistic Egyptian chronicler and priest, in his books on Egyptian history, alleges that in the 3rd century BCE, Moses was not a Jew, but an Egyptian renegade priest called Osarseph, and portrays the Exodus as the expulsion of a leper colony. Josephus argues that Manetho's claims are inconsistent.

In 629 the Roman emperor Heraclius I. had driven the Jews from Jerusalem. This was followed by a massacre of Jews throughout the empire—in Egypt, aided by the Copts, who had old scores to settle with the Jews, dating from the Persian conquest of Alexandria at the time of Byzantine Emperor Anastasius I (502) and of the Persian general Shahin (617), when the Jews assisted the conquerors in fighting against the Christians.

The mad caliph Al-Ḥakim (996-1020) vigorously applied the Pact of Omar, and compelled the Jews to wear bells and to carry in public the wooden image of a calf. A street in the city, Al-Jaudariyyah, was inhabited by Jews. Al-Ḥakim, hearing that they were accustomed to mock him in verses, had the whole quarter burned down.

Under the Bahri dynasty (1250–1390), one of the Mamluk dynasties, the Jews led a comparatively quiet existence; though they had at times to contribute heavily toward the maintenance of the vast military equipment, and were harassed by the cadis and ulemas of these strict Muslims. Al-Maqrizi relates that the first great Mameluke, Sultan Baibars (Al-Malik al-Thahir (1260–77), doubled the tribute paid by the "ahl al-dhimmah." At one time he had resolved to burn all the Jews, a ditch having been dug for that purpose; but at the last moment he repented, and instead exacted a heavy tribute, during the collection of which many perished.

In 1324 the Jews were accused of arson at Fostat and Cairo; they had to exculpate themselves by a payment of 50,000 gold pieces. Under the Burji Mamelukes the Franks again attacked Alexandria (1416), and the laws against the Jews were once more strictly enforced by Sheik al-Mu'ayyid (1412–21); by Ashraf Bars Bey (1422–38), because of a plague which decimated the population in 1438; by Al-Ẓahir Jaḳmaḳ (1438–53); and by Ḳa'iṭ-Bey (1468–95). The lastnamed is referred to by Obadiah of Bertinoro. The Jews of Cairo were compelled to pay 75,000 gold pieces.

In 1948, approximately 75,000 Jews lived in Egypt. About 100 remain today, mostly in Cairo. In 1948, Jewish neighborhoods in Cairo suffered bomb attacks that killed at least 70 Jews. Hundreds of Jews were arrested and had their property confiscated. The 1954 Lavon Affair, in which Israelis and Egyptian Jews were arrested for bombing Egyptian and American targets served as a pretext for further persecution of the remaining Jewish community in Egypt. After the 1956 Suez Crisis, Egypt expelled over 25,000 Jews, confiscated their property, and about 3,000 were imprisoned. About 1,000 more were imprisoned or detained. In 1967, Jews were detained and tortured, and Jewish homes were confiscated as emigration continued.

Egypt was once home of one of the most dynamic Jewish communities in their diaspora. Caliphs in the ninth-eleventh centuries CE exercised various repressive policies, culminating in the destruction and mass murder of the Jewish quarter in Cairo in 1012. Conditions varied between then and the advent of the Ottoman Empire in 1517, when they deteriorated again. There were at least six blood libel persecutions in cities between 1870 and 1892.

In more recent times, the fraudulent Protocols of the Elders of Zion have been published and promoted as though they were authentic historical records, fueling antisemitic sentiments in Egyptian public opinion.

Henry Ford's antisemitic treatise The International Jew has recently been published in Egypt, with distinctly antisemitic imagery on the cover.

Libya

The area now known as Libya was the home of one of the oldest Jewish communities in the world, dating back to at least 300 BCE.

In 1911 Libya became an Italian colony. In the late 1930s, the pro-Nazi Fascist Italian regime began passing antisemitic laws. As a result of these laws, Jews were fired from government jobs, some were dismissed from government schools, and their citizenship papers were stamped with the words "Jewish race." Despite this repression, 25% of the population of Tripoli was still Jewish in 1941 and 44 synagogues were maintained in the city. In 1942, German troops fighting the Allies in North Africa occupied the Jewish quarter of Benghazi, plundering shops and deporting more than 2,000 Jews across the desert. Sent to work in labor camps, more than 20% of this group of Jews perished.

In 1948, about 38,000 Jews lived in Libya.

A series of pogroms started in November 1945, when more than 140 Jews were killed in Tripoli and most synagogues in the city looted. The pogroms continued in June 1948, when 15 Jews were killed and 280 Jewish homes destroyed.

Upon Libya's independence in 1951, most of the Jewish community emigrated. After the Suez Crisis in 1956, another series of pogroms forced all but about 100 Jews to flee. When Muammar al-Gaddafi came to power in 1969, all remaining Jewish property was confiscated and all debts to Jews cancelled.

Although the main synagogue in Tripoli was renovated in 1999, it has not reopened for services. The last Jew in Libya, Esmeralda Meghnagi died in February 2002. Israel is home to about 40,000 Jews of Libyan descent, who maintain unique traditions.

Morocco 

Jewish communities, in Islamic times often living in ghettos known as mellah, have existed in Morocco for at least 2,000 years. Intermittent large scale massacres (such as that of 6,000 Jews in Fez in 1033, over 100,000 Jews in Fez and Marrakesh in 1146 and again in Marrakesh in 1232) were accompanied by systematic discrimination through the years. During the 13th through the 15th centuries Jews were appointed to a few prominent positions within the government, typically to implement decisions. A number of Jews, fleeing the expulsion from Spain and Portugal, settled in Morocco in the 15th century and afterwards, many moving on to the Ottoman Empire.

In 1875, 20 Jews were killed by a mob in Demnat, Morocco; elsewhere in Morocco, Jews were attacked and killed in the streets in broad daylight.

The imposition of a French protectorate in 1912 alleviated much of the discrimination.

The Shoah in French Morocco. While the pro-Nazi Vichy regime during World War II passed discriminatory laws against Jews, King Muhammad prevented deportation of Jews to death camps (although Jews with French, as opposed to Moroccan, citizenship, being directly subject to Vichy law, were still deported.)

In 1948, approximately 265,000 Jews lived in Morocco. Between 5,000 and 8,000 live there now, mostly in Casablanca, but also in Fez and other cities.

In June 1948, soon after Israel was established and in the midst of the first Arab-Israeli war, riots against Jews broke out in Oujda and Djerada, killing 44 Jews. In 1948–9, 18,000 Jews left the country for Israel. After this, Jewish emigration continued (to Israel and elsewhere), but slowed to a few thousand a year. Through the early fifties, Zionist organizations encouraged emigration, particularly in the poorer south of the country, seeing Moroccan Jews as valuable contributors to the Jewish State:

 ...These Jews constitute the best and most suitable human element for settlement in Israel's absorption centers. There were many positive aspects which I found among them: first and foremost, they all know (their agricultural) tasks, and their transfer to agricultural work in Israel will not involve physical and mental difficulties. They are satisfied with few (material needs), which will enable them to confront their early economic problems. (Yehuda Grinker (an organizer of Jewish emigration from the Atlas), The Emigration of Atlas Jews to Israel, Tel Aviv, The Association of Moroccan Immigrants in Israel, 1973.)

In 1955, Morocco attained independence. Jews occupied several political positions, including three Members of Parliament and a Minister of Posts and Telegraphs. However, emigration to Israel jumped from 8,171 in 1954 to 24,994 in 1955, increasing further in 1956. Beginning in 1956, emigration to Israel was prohibited until 1963, when it resumed. In 1961, the government informally relaxed the laws on emigration to Israel; over the three following years, more than 80,000 Moroccan Jews emigrated there. By 1967, only 60,000 Jews remained in Morocco.

The Six-Day War in 1967 led to increased Arab-Jewish tensions worldwide, including Morocco. By 1971, the Jewish population was down to 35,000; however, most of this wave of emigration went to Europe and North America rather than Israel.

Despite their current small numbers, Jews continue to play a notable role in Morocco; the king retains a Jewish senior adviser, André Azoulay, and Jewish schools and synagogues receive government subsidies. However, Jewish targets have sometimes been attacked (notably in Al-Qaeda's bombing of a Jewish community center in Casablanca, see Casablanca Attacks), and there is sporadic antisemitic rhetoric from radical Islamist groups. Late King Hassan II's invitations for Jews to return have not been taken up by the people who emigrated.

South Africa 

While South Africa is better known for the apartheid system of racial discrimination against blacks, antisemitism has been a feature of that country's history since Europeans first set foot ashore on the Cape Peninsula. In the years 1652–1795 – a period twice as long as the 20th-century reign of the National Party – Jews were not allowed to settle at the Cape. Subsequent Cape administrations - Batavian and British - were more progressive. An 1868 Act would sanction religious discrimination.

Although antisemitism did not disappear in the 19th century, it would reach its apotheosis in the years leading up to World War II. Inspired by the rise of national socialism in Germany the Ossewabrandwag (OB) - whose membership accounted for almost 25% of the 1940 Afrikaner population - and the National Party faction New Order would champion a more programmatic solution to the 'Jewish problem'. The Simon Wiesenthal Center reports that these two groups advocated three mechanisms: Jews who had entered the country after 1933 were to be repatriated; Jews who had arrived prior to 1933 would be regarded as foreign nationals; lastly, a system regulating Jewish numbers in business and the professions would be instituted. The same report lists some of the reasons South African gentiles gave for disliking Jews: too many of them in commerce and professions; profiteering; black market offences; loud and ostentatious; are apart and different; buy up the land; and most communists are Jews.

Tunisia 

Jews have lived in Tunisia for at least 2300 years. In the 13th century, Jews were expelled from their homes in Kairouan and were ultimately restricted to ghettos, known as hara. Forced to wear distinctive clothing, several Jews earned high positions in the Tunisian government. Several prominent international traders were Tunisian Jews. From 1855 to 1864, Muhammad Bey relaxed dhimmi laws, but reinstated them in the face of anti-Jewish riots that continued at least until 1869.

During the Second World War, the Shoah reached French Tunisia. Tunisia, under direct Nazi control during World War II, was also the site of racist antisemitic measures activities such as the yellow star, prison camps, deportations, and other persecution.

In 1948, approximately 105,000 Jews lived in Tunisia. About 1,500 remain today, mostly in Djerba, Tunis, and Zarzis. Following Tunisia's independence from France in 1956, a number of anti-Jewish policies led to emigration, of which half went to Israel and the other half to France. After attacks in 1967, Jewish emigration both to Israel and France accelerated. There were also attacks in 1982, 1985, and most recently in 2002 when a bomb in Djerba took 21 lives (most of them German tourists) near the local synagogue, in a terrorist attack claimed by Al-Qaeda.

The Tunisian government makes an active effort to protect its Jewish minority now and visibly supports its institutions.

Asia

Bahrain

Bahrain's tiny Jewish community, mostly the descendants of immigrants who entered the country in the early 1900s from Iraq, numbered about 1,500 in 1948. The Manama riots against the Bahraini Jewish community broke out in December 1947 in the wake of ongoing violence in Palestine. A mob looted Jewish homes and shops, destroyed the city's synagogue, physically assaulted Jews, and murdered an elderly Jewish woman. Further attacks took place following the Six-Day War in 1967. Most Jews left for other countries, especially Israel and the United Kingdom, with some 36 remaining as of 2006.

Today, relations between Jews and Muslims are generally considered good, with Bahrain being the only state on the Arabian Peninsula where there is a specific Jewish community and the only Gulf state with a synagogue, though it is not being used. Jews, despite their low number, play a prominent role in civil society. For example, Ebrahim Daoud Nonoo was appointed in 2002 a member of Bahrain's upper house of parliament, the Consultative Council, while Houda Nonoo has headed the human rights group, Bahrain Human Rights Watch Society since 2004, and was appointed to the Consultative Council in 2005. She was Bahrain's ambassador to the United States from 2008 to 2013.

India

India is home to several communities of Jews. Over the course of the twentieth century, several important Hindu leaders, scholars and politicians, such as Vinayak Damodar Savarkar, Sita Ram Goel, Arun Shourie and others have vocally condemned antisemitism and have expressed support for Israel and the Jewish right to self-determination.

Of the few antisemitic incidents that were reported, most were related to imported antisemitism from Portuguese Catholic colonists and missionaries in the 16th century. Christian antisemitism in India manifested itself through the Goa Inquisition that resulted in the depopulation of the Jews in Goa, and the persecution of South Indian Jews by the Portuguese in Kerala. Many European Jews known as Paradesi Jews were given shelter at the time of Portuguese inquisition of Spain and Portugal in Kerala.

Iran

Mahmoud Ahmadinejad, former president of Iran, has frequently been accused of denying the Holocaust.

Ali Khamenei, the supreme leader of Iran, has repeatedly doubted the validity of the reported casualties of the Holocaust. In one meeting he claimed that the Zionists have had "close relations" with the Nazi leaders and that "providing exaggerated statistics [of the Holocaust] has been a method to justify the Zionists' cruel treatment of the Palestinians".

In July 2012, the winner of Iran's first annual International Wall Street Downfall Cartoon Festival, jointly sponsored by the semi-state-run Iranian media outlet Fars News, was an antisemitic cartoon depicting Jews praying before the New York Stock Exchange, which is made to look like the Western Wall. Other cartoons in the contest were antisemitic as well. The national director of the Anti-Defamation League, Abraham Foxman, condemned the cartoon, stating that "Here's the anti-Semitic notion of Jews and their love for money, the canard that Jews 'control' Wall Street, and a cynical perversion of the Western Wall, the holiest site in Judaism," and "Once again Iran takes the prize for promoting antisemitism."

ADL/Global 100 reported in 2014 that 56% of Iranians hold antisemitic beliefs, and 18% of them agreed that Jews probably talk too much about the Holocaust. However, the reported results (56%) were reported to be the lowest in the Middle East.

Iranian Jews along with Christians and Zoroastrians are protected under the Constitution and have seats reserved for them in the Iranian Parliament, However, de facto harassment still occurs. A 2021 report by ADL found antisemitism in Iranian textbooks, including characterizing Jews as the "enemies of Islam", inciting non-Jews to "annihilate Muslims", as stirring up "resentment and enmity among Muslims", as well as calling for Israel to be "wiped out."

Iraq

During the Sassanid rule over Assyria (Assuristan) (225 to 634) both  Assyrian Christians and Jews suffered occasional persecution, especially under Sassanian high-priest Kartir. The first legal expression of Islam toward the Jews, Assyrian Christians, Mandeans and Zoroastrians after the conquests of the 630s were the poll-tax ("jizyah"), the tax upon real estate ("kharaj") was instituted.

The Umayyad Caliph, Umar II. (717-720), persecuted the Jews. He issued orders to his governors: "Tear down no church, synagogue, or fire-temple; but permit no new ones to be built". It is said that the law requiring Jews to wear a yellow badge upon their clothing originated with Harun.

Historian Martin Gilbert writes that it was in the 19th century that the position of Jews worsened in Muslim countries. In 1828, there was a massacre of Jews in Baghdad.

In 1948, there were approximately 150,000 Jews in Iraq. In 2003, there were 100 left, though there are reports that small numbers of Jews are returning in the wake of the 2003 invasion of Iraq.

In 1941, following Rashid Ali's pro-Axis coup, riots known as the Farhud broke out in Baghdad in which approximately 200 Jews were murdered (some sources put the number higher), and up to 2,000 injured.

Like most Arab League states, Iraq forbade the emigration of its Jews for a few years after the 1948 war on the grounds that allowing them to go to Israel would strengthen that state. However, intense diplomatic pressure brought about a change of mind. At the same time, increasing government oppression of the Jews fueled by anti-Israeli sentiment, together with public expressions of antisemitism, created an atmosphere of fear and uncertainty.

In March 1950, Iraq passed a law of one-year duration allowing Jews to emigrate on condition of relinquishing their Iraqi citizenship. Iraq apparently believed it would rid itself of those Jews it regarded as the most troublesome, especially the Zionists, but retain the wealthy minority who played an important part in the Iraqi economy. Israel mounted an operation called "Ezra and Nehemiah" to bring as many of the Iraqi Jews as possible to Israel, and sent agents to Iraq to urge the Jews to register for immigration as soon as possible.

The initial rate of registration accelerated after a bomb injured three Jews at a café. Two months before the expiry of the law, by which time about 85,000 Jews had registered, a bomb at the Masuda Shemtov Synagogue killed three or five Jews and injured many. The law expired in March 1951, but was later extended after the Iraqi government froze the assets of departing Jews (including those already left). During the next few months, all but a few thousand of the remaining Jews registered for emigration, spurred on by a sequence of bombings that caused few casualties but had great psychological impact. In total, about 120,000 Jews left Iraq.

In May and June 1951, the arms caches of the Zionist underground in Iraq, which had been supplied from Palestine/Israel since the Farhud of 1942, were discovered. Many Jews were arrested and two Zionist activists, Yusuf Basri and Ibrahim Salih, were tried and hanged for three of the bombings. A secret Israeli inquiry in 1960 reported that most of the witnesses believed that Jews had been responsible for the bombings, but found no evidence that they were ordered by Israel. The issue remains unresolved: Iraqi activists in Israel still regularly charge that Israel used violence to engineer the exodus, while Israeli officials of the time vehemently deny it. According to historian Moshe Gatt, few historians believe that Israel was actually behind the bombing campaign—based on factors such as records indicating that Israel did not want such a rapid registration rate and that bomb throwing at Jewish targets was common before 1950, making the Istiqlal Party a more likely culprit than the Zionist underground. In any case, the remainder of Iraq's Jews left over the next few decades, and had mostly gone by 1970.

Japan

Japan does not have a native Jewish population; therefore, the history of antisemitism in Japan would seem to date back to a time when it was introduced into Japan as a result of contact between Japan and the Western world. Nazi ideology and propaganda left its influence on Japan during World War II, and the Protocols of the Elders of Zion were subsequently translated into Japanese. Today, antisemitism and the belief in Jewish manipulation of Japan and the world remain widespread despite the small size of the Jewish community in Japan. Books about Jewish conspiracies are best sellers. According to a 1988 survey, 8% of Japanese have read one of these books.

Malaysia

Although Malaysia presently has no substantial Jewish population, the country has reportedly become an example of a phenomenon called "antisemitism without Jews."

In his treatise on Malay identity, "The Malay Dilemma", published in 1970, Malaysian Prime Minister Mahathir Mohamad wrote: "The Jews are not only hooked-nosed... but understand money instinctively.... Jewish stinginess and financial wizardry gained them the economic control of Europe and provoked antisemitism which waxed and waned throughout Europe through the ages."

The Malay-language Utusan Malaysia daily stated in an editorial that Malaysians "cannot allow anyone, especially the Jews, to interfere secretly in this country's business... When the drums are pounded hard in the name of human rights, the pro-Jewish people will have their best opportunity to interfere in any Islamic country," the newspaper said. "We might not realize that the enthusiasm to support actions such as demonstrations will cause us to help foreign groups succeed in their mission of controlling this country." Prime Minister Najib Razak's office subsequently issued a statement late Monday saying Utusan's claim did "not reflect the views of the government."

Lebanon
In 2004, Al-Manar, a media network affiliated with Hezbollah, aired a drama series, The Diaspora, which observers allege is based on historical antisemitic allegations. BBC correspondents who have watched the program says it quotes extensively from the Protocols of the Elders of Zion.

Pakistan

There is a general stereotype against Jews in Pakistan. Jews are falsely regarded as "miserly"  when in fact the Bene Israel in Pakistan had numerous sororal and fraternal organizations prior to Partition to assist Jews their denominations and other faiths. 
The founding of the Islamic state of Pakistan immediately prior to the creation of Israel in the Levant created insecurity among Pakistan's Jews. After Israel's independence in 1948, violent acts were committed against Pakistan's small Jewish community of about 2,000 Bene Israel Jews. The synagogue in Karachi was attacked, as were individual Jews. The persecution of Jews resulted in their exodus as refugees to India whence many migrated to Israel, Canada, the United States, the UK and many Commonwealth countries. The Peshawar Jewish community ceased to exist.

Pakistani cricket icon Imran Khan's marriage to Jemima Goldsmith in 1996 caused furor in Pakistan and Khan was accused of acting as an agent of the "Jewish Lobby". Egyptian newspapers in Pakistan made other antisemitic accusations against Khan. After Khan complained, the stories were retracted.

Saudi Arabia

Saudi textbooks vilify Jews, call Jews apes; demand that students avoid and not befriend Jews; claim that Jews worship the devil; and encourage Muslims to engage in Jihad to vanquish Jews.
Saudi Arabian government officials and state religious leaders often promote the idea that Jews are conspiring to take over the entire world; as proof of their claims they publish and frequently cite The Protocols of the Elders of Zion as factual.

In 2004, the official Saudi Arabia tourism website said that Jews and holders of Israeli passports would not be issued visas to enter the country. After an uproar, the restriction against Jews was removed from the website although the ban against Israeli passport-holders remained. In late 2014, a Saudi newspaper reported that foreign workers of most religions, including Judaism, were welcome in the kingdom, but Israeli citizens were not.

Palestine

In March 2011, the Israeli government issued a paper claiming that "Anti-Israel and anti-Semitic messages are heard regularly in the government and private media and in the mosques and are taught in school books," to the extent that they are "an integral part of the fabric of life inside the PA." In August 2012, Israeli Strategic Affairs Ministry director-general Yossi Kuperwasser stated that Palestinian incitement to antisemitism is "going on all the time" and that it is "worrying and disturbing." At an institutional level, he said the PA has been promoting three key messages to the Palestinian people that constitute incitement: "that the Palestinians would eventually be the sole sovereign on all the land from the Jordan River to the Mediterranean Sea; that Jews, especially those who live in Israel, were not really human beings but rather 'the scum of mankind'; and that all tools were legitimate in the struggle against Israel and the Jews." In August 2014, the Hamas' spokesman in Doha said on live television that Jews use blood to make matzos.

Syria

During the 19th century the Jews of Damascus were several times victims of calumnies, the gravest being those of 1840 and 1860, in the reign of the sultan Abdülmecit I. That of 1840, commonly known as the Damascus affair, was an accusation of ritual murder brought against the Jews in connection with the death of Father Thomas. A Jewish barber was tortured until he "confessed"; two other Jews who were arrested died under torture, while a third converted to Islam to save his life. The second accusation brought against the Jews, in 1860, was that of having taken part in the massacre of the Christians by the Druze and the Muslims. Five hundred Muslims, who had been involved in the affair, were hanged by the grand vizier Fuad Pasha. Two hundred Jews were awaiting the same fate, in spite of their innocence, and the whole Jewish community had been fined 4,000,000 piastres. The condemned Jews were saved only by the official intervention of Fuad Pasha himself; that of the Prussian consul, Dr. Wetzstein; of Sir Moses Montefiore of London, and of the bankers Abraham Salomon Camondo of Constantinople and Shemaya Angel of Damascus. From that time to the end of the nineteenth century, several further blood accusations were brought against the Jews; these, however, never provoked any great excitement.

There is a tiny Syrian Jewish community that is confined mainly to Damascus; remnants of a formerly 40,000 strong community. After the 1947 UN Partition plan in Palestine, there were heavy pogroms against Jews in Damascus and Aleppo. The Jewish property was confiscated or burned and after the establishment of the State of Israel, many fled to Israel and only 5000 Jews were left in Syria. Of these, 4000 more left after agreement with the United States in the 1990s. As of 2006, there are only 100-200 Jews left in Syria.

Rioters in Aleppo in 1947 burned the city's Jewish quarter and killed 75 people. In 1948, there were approximately 30,000 Jews in Syria. The Syrian government placed severe restrictions on the Jewish community, including on emigration. Over the next decades, many Jews managed to escape, and the work of supporters, particularly Judy Feld Carr, in smuggling Jews out of Syria, and bringing their plight to the attention of the world, raised awareness of their situation. Following the Madrid Conference of 1991 the United States put pressure on the Syrian government to ease its restrictions on Jews, and, in 1992, the government of Syria began granting exit visas to Jews on condition that they not emigrate to Israel. At that time, the country had several thousand Jews; today, under a hundred remain. The rest of the Jewish community have emigrated, mostly to the United States and Israel. There is a large and vibrant Syrian Jewish community in South Brooklyn, New York. In 2004, the Syrian government attempted to establish better relations with the emigrants, and 12 Syrian-Jews visited Syria.

Turkey

Despite close economic and military ties to Israel, Turkey has experienced a recent surge in antisemitic literature, most notably the sale of Mein Kampf, the autobiography of Adolf Hitler, which has become a bestseller through the country. Sales of the similarly themed books The Protocols of the Elders of Zion and Henry Ford's The International Jew have also increased. In the same vein, the 2005 bestselling book Metal fırtına, which depicts a fictional war between Turkey and the United States, is described by the author, in an interview with Vatan, as helping people understand the realities behind Israel and the Jews, and would see how the Jews betrayed Turkey.

Antisemitic sentiments have also been observed in the Turkish media, such as in the nationalist Ortadogu, where Selcuk Duzgun, in an article titled Here is the Real Jew stated: "We are surrounded. Wherever we look we see traitors. Wherever we turn we see impure, false converts. Whichever stone you turn over, there is a Jew under it. And we keep thinking to ourselves: Hitler did not do enough to these Jews."

In the Milli Gazete, Turkish author Hakan Albayrak wrote an article accusing the Israeli Government of Genocide and stating Zionism itself constituted genocide. On 8 January the Islamist daily Yeni Şafak, published an article which alleged that the Israeli Government was attempting to set up farms in southeastern Turkey, and populate them with Russian and Ethiopian Jews whose integration into Israel they found difficult. In 2005, it was reported by journalists such as Ayhan Bilgin in Vakit, that the Mossad and Israel were responsible for planting mines which killed Turkish soldiers in southeast Turkey. Such claims have created a very negative atmosphere against Israelis and Turkish Jews. Antisemitism has also recently been observed in the publications Anadoluda Vakit and Yeniçağ.

Several antisemitic conspiracy theories from Islamists and ultra-nationalists in Turkey have attempted to demonize Jews and Israel. These theories have been fed in part by Turkish–Israeli arms modernization projects, agricultural projects in southeast Turkey connected to the South-East Anatolia Agricultural Irrigation Project, which employ Israeli experts; mutual visits of Turkish and Israeli officials; and the alleged role of the Mossad in northern Iraq (the Iraq War was highly unpopular in Turkey) making statements such as "The Mossad is the boss in Northern Iraq" have all nourished these theories. The common conspiracy theory that Jews, the supposed chosen people who consider themselves superior, are trying to take over the world by creating internal problems has also been cited by Turkish newspapers.

The well-known Turkish novelist Orhan Pamuk, often criticized and accused of being a traitor due to his interpretation of certain events in Turkish history, has been criticized as being "the servant of Jews," and "a Jew-lover" by the ultra-nationalist newspaper Yeniçağ.

Yemen 

Jews in Yemen were long subject to a number of restrictions, ranging from attire, hairstyle, home ownership, marriage, etc. Under the "Orphan's Decree", many Jewish orphans below puberty were raised as Muslims. This practice began in the late 18th century, was suspended under Ottoman rule, then was revived in 1918. Most cases occurred in the 1920s, but sporadic cases occurred until the 1940s. In later years, the Yemenite government has taken some steps to protect the Jewish community in their country.

In 1947, riots killed at least 80 Jews in Aden. In 1948, there were about 63,000 Jews in Yemen, including Aden. Today, there are about 50 left. Increasingly hostile conditions led to the Israeli government's Operation Magic Carpet, the evacuation of 50,000 Jews from Yemen to Israel in 1949 and 1950. Emigration continued until 1962, with the outbreak of the Yemen civil war. A small community remained, unknown until 1976, but it appears that all infrastructure is lost now.

By the late 1990s, only several hundred remained, mainly in a northwestern mountainous region named Sa'ada and town of Raida. Houthi members put up notes on the Jews' doors, accusing them of corrupting Muslim morals. Eventually, the Houthi leaders sent threatening messages to the Jewish community: "We warn you to leave the area immediately.... We give you a period of 10 days, or you will regret it."

On 28 March 2021, 13 Jews were forced by the Houthis to leave Yemen, leaving the last four elderly Jews in Yemen.

Europe

The summary of a 2004 poll by the "Pew Global Attitudes Project" noted, "Despite concerns about rising antisemitism in Europe, there are no indications that anti-Jewish sentiment has increased over the past decade. Favorable ratings of Jews are actually higher now in France, Germany and Russia than they were in 1991. Nonetheless, Jews are better liked in the U.S. than in Germany and Russia."

However, according to 2005 survey results by the ADL, antisemitic attitudes remain common in Europe. Over 30% of those surveyed indicated that Jews have too much power in business, with responses ranging from lows of 11% in Denmark and 14% in England to highs of 66% in Hungary, and over 40% in Poland and Spain. The results of religious antisemitism also linger and over 20% of European respondents agreed that Jews were responsible for the death of Jesus, with France having the lowest percentage at 13% and Poland having the highest number of those agreeing, at 39%.

The Vienna-based European Union Monitoring Centre (EUMC), for 2002 and 2003, identified France, Germany, the United Kingdom, Belgium, and the Netherlands as EU member countries with notable increases in incidents. Many of these incidents can be linked to immigrant communities in these countries and result from heightened tensions in the Middle East. As these nations keep reliable and comprehensive statistics on antisemitic acts, and are engaged in combating antisemitism, their data was readily available to the EUMC. 

In Eastern Europe, antisemitism remained a serious concern in Russia and Belarus, and elsewhere in the former Soviet Union, with most incidents carried out by ultra-nationalist and other far-right elements.

North America

United States

In the mid-1600s, Peter Stuyvesant, the last Dutch Director-General of the colony of New Amsterdam, sought to bolster the position of the Dutch Reformed Church by trying to reduce religious competition from denominations such as Jews, Lutherans, Catholics and Quakers. He stated that the Jews were "deceitful", "very repugnant", and "hateful enemies and blasphemers of the name of Christ". He warned in a subsequent letter that in "giving them liberty we cannot (then) refuse the Lutherans and Papists". However, religious plurality was already a legal-cultural tradition in New Amsterdam and in the Netherlands. His superiors at the Dutch West India Company in Amsterdam overruled him in all matters of intolerance.

In 1939 a Roper poll found that only thirty-nine percent of Americans felt that Jews should be treated like other people. Fifty-three percent believed that "Jews are different and should be restricted" and ten percent believed that Jews should be deported. Several surveys taken from 1940 to 1946 found that Jews were seen as a greater threat to the welfare of the United States than any other national, religious, or racial group. 
It has been estimated that 190,000 - 200,000 Jews could have been saved during the Second World War had it not been
for bureaucratic obstacles to immigration deliberately created by Breckinridge Long and others.

In a speech at an America First rally on September 11, 1941, in Des Moines, Iowa, entitled "Who Are the War Agitators?", Charles Lindbergh claimed that three groups had been "pressing this country toward war": the Roosevelt Administration, the British, and the Jews - and complained about what he insisted was the Jews' "large ownership and influence in our motion pictures, our press, our radio and our government." The antisemitism of Lindbergh is one of the subjects of the novel The Plot Against America (2004) by Philip Roth.

Unofficial antisemitism was also widespread in the first half of the century. For example, to limit the growing number of Jewish students between 1919 and 1950s a number of private liberal arts universities and medical and dental schools employed Numerus clausus. These included Harvard University, Columbia University, Cornell University, and Boston University. In 1925 Yale University, which already had such admissions preferences as "character", "solidity", and "physical characteristics" added a program of legacy preference admission spots for children of Yale alumni, in an explicit attempt to put the brakes on the rising percentage of Jews in the student body. This was soon copied by other Ivy League and other schools, and admissions of Jews were kept down to 10% through the 1950s. Such policies were for the most part discarded during the early 1960s.

Some cults also support conspiracy theories regarding Jews as dominating and taking over the world. These cults are often vitriolic and severely antisemitic. For instance, the Necedah Shrine Cult from the 1950s on to the mid-1980s, has Mary Ann Van Hoof receiving antisemitic "visions" from the Virgin Mary telling her that the Rothschilds, a prominent Jewish banking family, are "mongrel yids(Jews)" bent on dominating the entire world economy through international banking. Most of the worlds problems, from poverty to world wars, are the cause of International Banking Jews and their "satanic secret society," according to Van Hoof.

American antisemitism underwent a modest revival in the late twentieth century. The Nation of Islam under Louis Farrakhan claimed that Jews were responsible for slavery, economic exploitation of black labor, selling alcohol and drugs in their communities, and unfair domination of the economy. Jesse Jackson issued his infamous "Hymietown" remarks during the 1984 Presidential primary campaign.

According to ADL surveys begun in 1964, African-Americans are "significantly more likely" than white Americans to hold antisemitic beliefs, although there is a strong correlation between education level and the rejection of antisemitic stereotypes.

Strommen et al.'s 1970 survey of 4,745 North American Lutherans aged 15–65 found that, compared to the other minority groups under consideration, Lutherans were the least prejudiced toward Jews.

Canada

Canada’s Jewish community dates back to the 18th century, and antisemitism has confronted Canadian Jews since this time.

South America

Argentina 

A growing hate campaign was reported on 21 January 2015 against Israeli tourists in Patagonia, with a notable incident in Lago Puelo where 4 men shouted anti-Jewish slurs and violently attacked 10 Israelis staying at a hostel. The attackers were later charged under Argentina's anti-discrimination law and fined approximately $5,700. On December 2014, posters saying “Boycott Against Israeli Military Tourism” were put up in Bariloche, a city popular with Israeli tourists.

Chile 

After a 23-year-old Israeli backpacker was arrested in January 2012 on suspicion of having accidentally ignited a fire in Torres del Paine National Park, he reportedly received taunts calling him a “filthy Jew” while being escorted to court. In February 2017, National Forest Corporation director Elizabeth Munoz criticized Israeli visitors for “cultural bad behavior” and said they would be removed from hostels if they presented "an aggressive attitude", her comments were denounced by Chile's umbrella Jewish organization.

Chilean politician and former presidential candidate Daniel Jadue has faced accusations of antisemitism.

Uruguay 
A 2014 poll from the Anti-Defamation League had 33% of Uruguayan respondents classified as harbouring antisemitic attitudes. In January 2018, an Uruguayan hotelier was reported to have a policy of rejecting Israeli post-military youth as his guests, which drew criticism from Uruguay's umbrella Jewish organisation Comite Central Israelita, its Minister of Tourism Liliam Kechichian, and B'nai B'rith International.

Venezuela 

Following the onset of the 2009 Israel-Gaza conflict, the Venezuelan government expressed disagreement with Israel's actions. On 5 January, President Chávez accused the United States of poisoning Palestinian president Yasser Arafat in order to destabilize the Middle East. He also described the offensive by Israel as a Palestinian "holocaust". Days later, the Venezuelan foreign ministry called Israel's actions "state terrorism" and announced the expulsion of the Israeli ambassador and some of the embassy staff. Following the order of expulsion of the Israeli ambassador, incidents targeting various Jewish institutions occurred in Venezuela. Protests occurred in Caracas with demonstrators throwing shoes at the Israeli Embassy while some sprayed graffiti on the facility. At the Tiféret Israel Synagogue, individuals spray painted "Property of Islam" on its walls. Later that month, the synagogue was targeted again. During the night of 31 January 2009, an armed gang consisting of 15 unidentified men broke into Tiféret Israel Synagogue, the synagogue of the Israelite Association of Venezuela, the oldest synagogue in the Venezuelan capital Caracas and occupied the building for several hours. The gang tied and gagged security guards before destroying offices and the place where holy books were kept; this happened during the Jewish shabbat. They daubed the walls with anti-Semitic and anti-Israeli graffiti that called for Jews to be expelled from the country. They had also stolen a database that listed Jews who lived in Venezuela.
In a 2009 news story, Michael Rowan and Douglas E. Schoen wrote, "In an infamous Christmas Eve speech several years ago, Chávez said the Jews killed Christ and have been gobbling up wealth and causing poverty and injustice worldwide ever since." Hugo Chávez stated that "[t]he world is for all of us, then, but it so happens that a minority, the descendants of the same ones that crucified Christ, the descendants of the same ones that kicked Bolívar out of here and also crucified him in their own way over there in Santa Marta, in Colombia. A minority has taken possession of all of the wealth of the world."

In February 2012, opposition candidate for the 2012 Venezuelan presidential election Henrique Capriles was subject to what foreign journalists characterized as vicious attacks by state-run media sources. The Wall Street Journal said that Capriles "was vilified in a campaign in Venezuela's state-run media, which insinuated he was, among other things, a homosexual and a Zionist agent". A 13 February 2012 opinion article in the state-owned Radio Nacional de Venezuela, titled "The Enemy is Zionism" attacked Capriles' Jewish ancestry and linked him with Jewish national groups because of a meeting he had held with local Jewish leaders, saying, "This is our enemy, the Zionism that Capriles today represents... Zionism, along with capitalism, are responsible for 90% of world poverty and imperialist wars."

Antisemitism rates by nation

See also
 Expulsions and exoduses of Jews
 History of antisemitism
 History of the Jews under Muslim rule
 Jewish diaspora
 Jewish exodus from the Muslim world
 Jewish history
 Jewish population by country
 Jewish refugees
 Jewish views on religious pluralism
 Martyrdom in Judaism
 Persecution of Jews
 Racism by country

References

Sources

External links
Antisemitism index

 
Human geography

cs:Antisemitismus ve světě